Kim Tae-yun or Kim Tae-yoon is a Korean name consisting of the family name Kim and the given name Tae-yun, and may also refer to:

 Kim Tae-yoon (footballer) (born 1986), South Korean footballer
 Kim Tae-yoon (archer) (born 1993), South Korean archer
 Kim Tae-yun (speed skater) (born 1994), South Korean speed skater
 Kim Tae-yoon (film and television director), director of Mr. Zoo: The missing VIP and Tommorow (South Korean TV series)

See also
 Kim Tae-yeon (disambiguation) (김태연)